The 2014 FIFA World Cup qualification UEFA Group B was a UEFA qualifying group for the 2014 FIFA World Cup. The group comprised Italy, Denmark, Czech Republic, Bulgaria, Armenia and Malta.

The group winners, Italy, qualified directly for the 2014 FIFA World Cup. Denmark finished runners-up but were ranked as the poorest of the nine group runners-up and so did not advance to the play-offs.

Standings

Denmark was ranked as the worst runner-up among all nine groups (having scored fewer points than the other eight) and so they failed to advance to the play-offs.

Matches
The match schedule was determined at a meeting in Prague, Czech Republic, on 28 November 2011.

Notes

Goalscorers
There were 80 goals in 30 games for an average of 2.67 goals per game.

5 goals

 Mario Balotelli

4 goals

 Yura Movsisyan
 Daniel Agger
 Pablo Daniel Osvaldo

3 goals

 Henrikh Mkhitaryan
 Stanislav Manolev
 Aleksandar Tonev
 Nicklas Bendtner

2 goals

 Aras Özbiliz
 Emil Gargorov
 Ivelin Popov
 Tomáš Pekhart
 Matěj Vydra
 Morten Rasmussen
 Daniele De Rossi
 Michael Mifsud

1 goal

 Gevorg Ghazaryan
 Karlen Mkrtchyan
 Artur Sarkisov
 Radoslav Dimitrov
 Ivan Ivanov
 Georgi Milanov
 Dimitar Rangelov
 Bořek Dočkal
 Theodor Gebre Selassie
 Daniel Kolář
 Libor Kozák
 Jan Rezek
 Tomáš Rosický
 Tomáš Hübschman
 David Lafata
 Václav Kadlec
 Leon Andreasen
 Andreas Bjelland
 Andreas Cornelius
 Simon Kjær
 William Kvist
 Nicki Bille Nielsen
 Niki Zimling
 Giorgio Chiellini
 Mattia Destro
 Alessandro Florenzi
 Alberto Gilardino
 Riccardo Montolivo
 Federico Peluso
 Andrea Pirlo
 Alberto Aquilani
 Roderick Briffa
 Clayton Failla
 Edward Herrera

1 own goal

 Ryan Camilleri (playing against Denmark)

Discipline

Attendances

References

External links
Results and schedule for UEFA Group B (FIFA.com version)
Results and schedule for UEFA Group B (UEFA.com version)

B
2012–13 in Italian football
Qual
2012–13 in Bulgarian football
2013–14 in Bulgarian football
2012–13 in Czech football
2013–14 in Czech football
2012–13 in Maltese football
2013–14 in Maltese football
2012–13 in Armenian football
2013–14 in Armenian football
2012–13 in Danish football
2013–14 in Danish football